Paratybe snizeki is a species of beetle in the family Cerambycidae, and the only species in the genus Paratybe. It was described by Téocchi and Sudre in 2003.

References

Pteropliini
Beetles described in 2003